Schouweiler is a small town in the commune of Dippach, in south-western Luxembourg.  , the town has a population of 1,071.  It is the administrative centre of Dippach commune.

External links
 Dippach municipal website: Schouweiler 

Dippach
Towns in Luxembourg